This is a list of cities and municipalities in the Baltimore–Washington metropolitan area.

Central cities
 Baltimore, Maryland (Major airport: adjacent to Baltimore–Washington International Thurgood Marshall Airport, in Anne Arundel County)
 Washington, DC
 Frederick, Maryland
 Annapolis, Maryland
 Hagerstown, Maryland

Suburbs with more than 100,000 inhabitants

Maryland
 Columbia

Virginia
 Alexandria
 Arlington (Major airport: Ronald Reagan Washington National Airport, Recognized as a "central city" by the U.S. Census Bureau)

Suburbs with 10,000 to 100,000 inhabitants

Maryland
 Aberdeen
 Accokeek
 Adelphi
 Annapolis Neck
 Arbutus
 Arnold
 Aspen Hill
 Ballenger Creek
 Bel Air
 Bel Air North
 Bel Air South
 Beltsville
 Bensville
 Bethesda
 Bowie
 Brooklyn Park
 California
 Calverton
 Camp Springs
 Carney
 Catonsville
 Chesapeake Ranch Estates
 Chevy Chase
 Chillum
 Clarksburg
 Clinton
 Cloverly
 Cockeysville
 Colesville
 College Park
 Crofton
 Damascus
 Dundalk
 East Riverdale
 Edgewood
 Eldersburg
 Elkridge
 Ellicott City
 Essex
 Fairland
 Ferndale
 Forestville
 Fort Washington
 Gaithersburg
 Germantown
 Glassmanor
 Glen Burnie
 Glenmont
 Glenn Dale
 Greenbelt
 Hagerstown
 Halfway
 Havre de Grace
 Hillcrest Heights
 Hyattsville
 Ilchester
 Joppatowne
 Kemp Mill
 Kettering
 Lake Shore
 Landover
 Langley Park
 Lanham
 Largo
 Laurel
 Lexington Park
 Linthicum
 Lochearn
 Maryland City
 Mays Chapel
 Middle River
 Milford Mill
 Mitchellville
 Montgomery Village
 New Carrollton
 North Bethesda
 North Potomac
 Odenton
 Olney
 Overlea
 Owings Mills
 Oxon Hill
 Parkville
 Parole
 Pasadena
 Perry Hall
 Pikesville
 Potomac
 Randallstown
 Redland
 Reisterstown
 Riviera Beach
 Rockville
 Rosaryville
 Rosedale
 Rossville
 Scaggsville
 Seabrook
 Severn
 Severna Park
 Silver Spring
 South Laurel
 Suitland
 Summerfield
 Takoma Park
 Towson
 Travilah
 Waldorf
 Walker Mill
 Westminster
 Wheaton
 White Oak
 Woodlawn, Baltimore County

Virginia
 Annandale
 Ashburn
 Bailey's Crossroads
 Broadlands
 Buckhall
 Bull Run
 Burke
 Burke Centre
 Cascades
 Centreville
 Chantilly (major airport: Washington Dulles International Airport)
 Cherry Hill
 Countryside
 Culpeper
 Dale City
 Dranesville
 Fairfax
 Fairfax Station
 Fair Oaks, Fairfax County
 Falls Church
 Fort Hunt
 Franconia
 Franklin Farm
 Fredericksburg (acts as a central city)
 Front Royal
 Gainesville
 Great Falls
 Groveton
 Herndon
 Huntington
 Hybla Valley
 Idylwood
 Kings Park West
 Kingstowne
 Lake Ridge
 Lansdowne
 Leesburg
 Lincolnia
 Linton Hall
 Lorton
 Lowes Island
 Manassas
 Manassas Park
 Marumsco
 McLean
 McNair
 Merrifield
 Montclair
 Mount Vernon
 Neabsco
 Newington
 Newington Forest
 Oakton
 Reston
 Rose Hill
 South Riding
 Springfield
 Sterling
 Sudley
 Sugarland Run
 Tysons Corner
 Vienna
 Wakefield, Fairfax County
 West Falls Church
 West Springfield
 Wolf Trap
 Woodlawn, Fairfax County

West Virginia
 Martinsburg

Suburbs with fewer than 10,000 inhabitants

Maryland
 Aberdeen Proving Ground
 Adamstown
 Andrews AFB
 Antietam
 Aquasco
 Arden on the Severn
 Ashton-Sandy Spring
 Baden
 Bagtown
 Bakersville
 Baltimore Highlands
 Barclay
 Barnesville
 Bartonsville
 Beaver Creek
 Benedict
 Berwyn Heights
 Big Pool
 Big Spring
 Bladensburg
 Boonsboro
 Bowleys Quarters
 Braddock Heights
 Brandywine
 Breathedsville
 Brentwood
 Brock Hall
 Brookeville
 Brookmont
 Broomes Island
 Brownsville
 Brunswick
 Bryans Road
 Bryantown
 Buckeystown
 Burkittsville
 Burtonsville
 Cabin John
 Calvert Beach
 Cape Saint Claire
 Capitol Heights
 Cavetown
 Charlotte Hall
 Cearfoss
 Cedarville
 Centreville
 Charlton
 Chesapeake Beach
 Chester
 Cheverly
 Chevy Chase Section 3
 Chevy Chase Section 5
 Chevy Chase View
 Chevy Chase Village
 Chewsville
 Church Hill
 Clear Spring
 Cobb Island
 Colmar Manor
 Coral Hills
 Cottage City
 Croom
 Crownsville
 Dargan
 Darlington
 Darnestown
 Deale
 Derwood
 District Heights
 Downsville
 Drum Point
 Dunkirk
 Eagle Harbor
 Eakles Mill
 Edgemere
 Edgemont
 Edgewater
 Edmonston
 Emmitsburg
 Ernstville
 Fairmount Heights
 Fairplay
 Fairview
 Fairwood
 Fallston
 Forest Glen
 Forest Heights
 Fort Meade
 Fort Ritchie
 Fountainhead-Orchard Hills
 Four Corners
 Friendly
 Friendship
 Friendship Heights Village
 Fulton
 Funkstown
 Galesville
 Gambrills
 Gapland
 Garrett Park
 Garretts Mill
 Garrison
 Glen Echo
 Glenarden
 Golden Beach
 Grasonville
 Greensburg
 Hampstead
 Hampton
 Hancock
 Herald Harbor
 Highfield-Cascade
 Highland
 Highland Beach
 Hillandale
 Hughesville
 Huntingtown
 Indian Head
 Indian Springs
 Jarrettsville
 Jefferson
 Jessup
 Jugtown
 Keedysville
 Kemps Mill
 Kensington
 Kent Narrows
 Kingstown
 Kingsville
 Konterra
 La Plata
 Lake Arbor
 Landover Hills
 Lansdowne
 Layhill
 Laytonsville
 Leisure World
 Leitersburg
 Leonardtown
 Libertytown
 Linganore
 Long Beach
 Lusby
 Lutherville
 Manchester
 Mapleville
 Marlboro Meadows
 Marlboro Village
 Marlow Heights
 Marlton
 Martin's Additions
 Maugansville
 Mayo
 Mechanicsville
 Melwood
 Mercersville
 Middleburg
 Middletown
 Monrovia
 Morningside
 Mount Aetna
 Mount Airy
 Mount Briar
 Mount Lena
 Mount Rainier
 Myersville
 National Harbor
 Naval Academy
 New Market
 New Windsor
 North Beach
 North Brentwood
 North Chevy Chase
 North Kensington
 North Laurel
 Owings
 Paramount-Long Meadow
 Pecktonville
 Peppermill Village
 Perryman
 Pinesburg
 Piney Point
 Pleasant Hills
 Point of Rocks
 Pomfret
 Pondsville
 Poolesville
 Port Tobacco Village
 Potomac Heights
 Prince Frederick
 Pylesville
 Queen Anne, Prince George's County
 Queen Anne, Queen Anne's County
 Queenland
 Queenstown
 Reid
 Ringgold
 Riva
 Riverdale Park
 Riverside
 Robinwood
 Rock Point
 Rohrersville
 Rosemont
 Sabillasville
 St. George Island
 Saint James
 Saint Leonard
 San Mar
 Sandy Hook
 Savage
 Seat Pleasant
 Shady Side
 Sharpsburg
 Silver Hill
 Smithsburg
 Solomons
 Somerset
 South Kensington
 Spencerville
 Spring Ridge
 Springdale
 Stevensville
 Sudlersville
 Sykesville
 Tall Timbers
 Taneytown
 Temple Hills
 Templeville
 Thurmont
 Tilghmanton
 Timonium
 Trego-Rohrersville Station
 Union Bridge
 University Park
 Upper Marlboro
 Urbana
 Walkersville
 Washington Grove
 West Laurel
 Westphalia
 White Marsh
 Williamsport
 Wilson-Conococheague
 Woodlawn, Prince George's County
 Woodmore
 Woodsboro
 Yarrowsburg

Virginia
 Aquia Harbour
 Arcola
 Bealeton
 Belle Haven
 Belmont
 Berryville
 Boswell's Corner
 Boyce
 Brambleton
 Bull Run Mountain Estates
 Calverton
 Catlett
 Clifton
 County Center
 Crosspointe
 Dahlgren
 Dulles Town Center (major airport: Washington Dulles International Airport)
 Dumfries
 Dunn Loring
 Fair Lakes
 Fairview Beach
 Falmouth
 Floris
 Fort Belvoir
 George Mason
 Greenbriar
 Hamilton
 Hayfield
 Haymarket
 Hillsboro
 Independent Hill
 King George
 Kings Park
 Lake Barcroft
 Laurel Hill
 Linton Hall
 Loch Lomond
 Long Branch
 Loudoun Valley Estates
 Lovettsville
 Mantua
 Marshall
 Mason Neck
 Middleburg
 Midland
 Moorefield Station
 New Baltimore
 Nokesville
 North Springfield
 Oak Grove
 Occoquan
 Opal
 Pimmit Hills
 Potomac Mills
 Purcellville
 Quantico
 Quantico Base
 Ravensworth
 Remington
 Round Hill
 Seven Corners
 Shenandoah Retreat
 South Run
 Southern Gateway
 Spotsylvania Courthouse
 Stafford Courthouse
 Stone Ridge
 The Plains
 Triangle
 University Center
 Warrenton
 Woodburn
 Yorkshire

West Virginia
 Bolivar
 Charles Town
 Falling Waters
 Harpers Ferry
 Hedgesville
 Inwood
 Middleway
 Ranson
 Shannondale
 Shenandoah Junction
 Shepherdstown

Baltimore–Washington metropolitan area
Baltimore-related lists
Washington, D.C.-related lists